"Bar Room Buddies" is a song written by Milton Brown, Cliff Crofford, Steve Dorff and Snuff Garrett, and recorded by American country music artist Merle Haggard and actor Clint Eastwood.  It was released in April 1980 and is featured on the soundtrack for the film Bronco Billy starring Eastwood.  The single stayed at number one for one week and spent a total of thirteen weeks on the Billboard country charts.

Chart performance

Year-end charts

References

1980 singles
Merle Haggard songs
Clint Eastwood songs
Songs about alcohol
Songs about friendship
Songs written by Steve Dorff
Songs written by Snuff Garrett
Song recordings produced by Snuff Garrett
Male vocal duets
Songs written for films
Elektra Records singles
1980 songs